Redbank  may refer to:

Places
In Australia
Redbank, Queensland, a suburb in Ipswich
Redbank, Victoria
Redbanks, South Australia

In the United States
Redbank Township, Armstrong County, Pennsylvania
Redbank Township, Clarion County, Pennsylvania
Saluda, South Carolina, formerly known as Redbank

Streams
In the United States
Redbank Creek (Pennsylvania), a tributary of the Allegheny River

See also

Red Bank (disambiguation)
Red Banks (disambiguation)